Market and Guerrero (eastbound) and Market and Laguna (westbound) are a pair of one-way light rail stations in San Francisco, California, United States, serving the San Francisco Municipal Railway F Market & Wharves heritage railway line. They are located on Market Street at the intersections of Laguna Street and Guerrero Street.

In 2021–22, the SFMTA extended the outbound boarding island as part of the Upper Market Street Safety Project. New decorative railings, which feature a quote from Harvey Milk's 1977 "You've Got to Have Hope" speech as well as an illustration of streetcar #1051 (which is dedicated in Milk's honor) were added to both islands.

References 

San Francisco Municipal Railway streetcar stations